Andrew Gailbraith Hemmings (born 9 August 1954 in Reading, Berkshire) is a British sailor who has sailed at the Olympic Games and in multiple America's Cups.

Hemmings was a world youth champion in the 470 and former UK and world champion in the 420. He was also UK, European and World champion in the J/24. He was selected to represent Great Britain at the 1988 Summer Olympics, sailing in a 470 with Jason Belben. The pair placed 15th. He again represented Great Britain at the 1992 Summer Olympics, placing 6th in the Men's 470 alongside Paul Brotherton.

Hemmings sailed as a trimmer with Luna Rossa Challenge in the 2003 Louis Vuitton Cup before joining Team New Zealand for the 2007 Louis Vuitton Cup.

References

Living people
English male sailors (sport)
1954 births
Sportspeople from Reading, Berkshire
English Olympic competitors
Olympic sailors of Great Britain
Sailors at the 1988 Summer Olympics – 470
Sailors at the 1992 Summer Olympics – 470
Luna Rossa Challenge sailors
2003 America's Cup sailors
2007 America's Cup sailors
Team New Zealand sailors